Perry Street is a prominent street in Savannah, Georgia, United States. It is interrupted by Colonial Park Cemetery from Abercorn Street to Habersham Street. Originally known only as Perry Street singular, its addresses are now split between "West Perry Street" and "East Perry Street", the transition occurring at Bull Street in the center of the downtown area. It is named for commodore Oliver Hazard Perry, who served in the War of 1812. The street is entirely within Savannah Historic District, a National Historic Landmark District.

Perry Street passes through three squares on their southern side. From west to east:

 Orleans Square
 Chippewa Square
 Crawford Square

Notable buildings and structures 

Below is a selection of notable buildings and structures on Perry Street, all in Savannah's Historic District. From west to east:

West Perry Street
John Morel Property, 117–119 West Perry Street (1818)
Henry Hayme Duplex, 113–115 West Perry Street (1887)
Mordecai Myers House, 111 West Perry Street (1833)
Laura Mehrtens House, 109 West Perry Street (1904)
John Martin–A.J. Miller Duplex, 105–107 West Perry Street (1872)
Frederick Tebeau House, 101 West Perry Street (1836)
Stoddard Row, 19–25 West Perry Street (1855)
John Stoddard House, 15 West Perry Street (1867)
3 West Perry Street (1831)

East Perry Street
Hetty, Abbie & Phillipa Minis House, 11 East Perry Street (circa 1820)
James Roberts Row House, 517–523 East Perry Street (1871)

References 

Roads in Savannah, Georgia
Streets in Georgia (U.S. state)